San Giorgio in Braida is a Roman Catholic church in Verona, region of Veneto, Italy. A church titled San Giacomo in Braida, was located in Cremona, and became superseded by Sant'Agostino.

History
In 1046,  the deacon of the Verona Cathedral, later bishop, Cadalo commissioned the construction of a Benedictine monastery outside the city walls, in a suburb called Braida. By 1051, the monastery was generally complete, and the Holy Roman Emperor Henry III placed it under his protection. By 1121, the monastery had a church. However, by 1127, the then bishop Bernardo expelled the monks for "keeping an abbey in a situation of spiritual, temporal, and material degradation". By 1132, the bishop with the blessing of Pope Innocent II assigned the monastery to the Canons Regular, an Augustinian order. In 1441, Pope Eugene IV favored the transfer of the monastery to the Venetian Augustinian order of Canons Regular of San Giorgio in Alga, reflecting in part the ascendancy of the republic in Verona since their fusion with Venice in 1405. In 1668, these canons were abolished by Pope Clement IX. The monastery was sold at auction, but was acquired by the Nuns of Santa Maria di Reggio, who administered the church until their suppression in 1806. The church became an oratory subsidiary to Santo Stefano, and only acquired the parish dignity in 1874.

It was built in the 16th century in the medieval quarter of Veronetta. The 12th-century bell tower is what remains of a monastery built in the eleventh century. The facade is marble white with two rows of pillars. The statues of St. George and St. Lorenzo Giustiniani are on sides. In 1540 Michele Sanmicheli built the dome of the church.

The interior has a single nave built between 1536 and 1543, and contains above the main door a Tintoretto  depicting the Baptism of Christ. The church houses Paolo Veronese's masterpiece, The Martyrdom of St George.

In 1776 were cast the six bells tuned in the scale of G major, on which was developed the Veronese bellringing art.

Sources

 

Roman Catholic churches completed in 1543
16th-century Roman Catholic church buildings in Italy
Giorgio in Braida
Renaissance architecture in Verona